Gira Sarabhai (11 December 1923 – 15 July 2021) was an Indian architect, designer, and a design pedagogue. She was born into the Sarabhai family and was the youngest of eight siblings. She is known for contributing to several industrial and educational projects in Gujarat. She was the representative of the Sarabhai Foundation, a public charitable trust. Gira, along with her brother Gautam Sarabhai were crucial in establishing and designing the academic curricula of National Institute of Design, Ahmedabad.

Early life 

Gira Sarabhai was born on 11 December 1923 to industrialist Ambalal Sarabhai and Reva (later renamed as Saraladevi Sarabhai) in Ahmedabad and was the youngest of their eight children. She was home schooled along with her siblings, and never had a formal education. In her late teens, she moved to New York with her family. In the United States she went on to train with Frank Lloyd Wright at his Taliesin West Studio in Arizona from 1947 to 1951.

Career 
Gira and her brother, Gautam Sarabhai worked together in Calico Mills, and also in several other architecture and design projects. She also started Shilpi, a graphic design agency which was the first Indian based advertising agency.

Gira along with her brother Gautam made significant contributions to modern architecture in India, during 1950s and 1960s. Their work was highly influenced by Frank Lloyd Wright. They sought to create an architectural response to regional concerns by using local materials. They were instrumental in inviting Charles and Ray Eames, Buckminster Fuller, Louis Kahn, and Frei Otto to Ahmedabad in order for those architectural and design luminaries to develop architecture and design education in India. They contributed prominently to the setting up of several leading national institutes in Ahmedabad, such as the National Institute of Design, Indian Institute of Management Ahmedabad, and B. M. Institute of Mental Health.

In 1949, Sarabhai established, designed the building, and curated the Calico Museum of Textiles which houses a historic collection of Indian fabrics. It is also a centre for design knowledge, resources, research, and publication. From 1951 to 1955, as Le Corbusier worked on the design of Villa Sarabhai, he consulted with Gira Sarabhai. 

Gira and Gautam worked in collaboration with Fuller to develop the experimental Calico Dome. It was the first space frame structure in India, which lays collapsed. As of 2019, the dome is being reconstructed by the Ahmedabad Municipal Corporation as a heritage site.

Towards the later years of her career she started experimenting with traditional Indian forms, elements, and motifs for her contemporary work.

National Institute of Design 
Gira, along with Gautam, had been crucial in establishing the National Institute of Design at Ahmedabad (NID) in the 1960s. They organized regular consultations at Sanskar Kendra Museum, with experts such as Dashrath Patel, James Prestini, and Vikram Sarabhai, to brainstorm on the academic model for the institute. Under the mentorship of Gira and Gautam, the first cohort of designers trained in India graduated.

Sarabhai was also instrumental in designing the main NID building. Kurma Rao, design consultant, educator, and alumni of NID Textile design department, gives Gira Sarabhai credit in shaping the Textile Design Program at NID. She would visit the institute, observe the students and give valuable feedback and make sure the students have full access to the Calico Museum, a privilege not extended to others.

Gira Sarabhai was also instrumental in selecting a wide selection of books, magazines, periodicals from audio-visual material for NID's library (now known as Knowledge Management Centre).  

In 1964, Gira Sarabhai invited George Nakashima to the institute, where he designed various furniture articles. Until Sarabhai stepped down in 1975, production of the designs continued based on the drawings and instructions by Nakashima. Sarabhai invited several people from the Royal College of Art in London to serve as consultants for NID.

Students at NID recalled that she emphasised discipline and attention to detail in her work.

Death
Sarabhai died on 15 July 2021 at her residence in Shahibaug, Ahmedabad.

See also 
Sarabhai family
Achyut Kanvinde

References 

1923 births
2021 deaths
Indian women designers
Indian women architects
Sarabhai family
Artists from Ahmedabad
Modernist architects
Designers at National Institute of Design